Slender Man (also spelled Slenderman) is a fictional supernatural character that originated as a creepypasta Internet meme created by Something Awful forum user Eric Knudsen (also known as "Victor Surge") in 2009. He is depicted as a thin, unnaturally tall humanoid with a featureless white head and face, wearing a black suit.

Stories of the Slender Man commonly feature his stalking, abducting, or traumatizing people, particularly children. The Slender Man has become a pop culture icon, although he is not confined to a single narrative but appears in many disparate works of fiction, typically composed online. Fiction relating to the Slender Man encompasses many media, including literature, art and video series such as Marble Hornets (2009–2014), wherein he is known as The Operator. The character has appeared in the video game Slender: The Eight Pages (2012) and its successor Slender: The Arrival (2013), as well as inspiring the Enderman in Minecraft. He has also appeared in a 2015 film adaptation of Marble Hornets, where he was portrayed by Doug Jones, and an eponymous 2018 film, where he was portrayed by Javier Botet.

Beginning in 2014, a moral panic occurred over the Slender Man after readers of his fiction were connected to several violent acts, particularly a near-fatal stabbing of a 12-year-old girl in Waukesha, Wisconsin. The stabbing inspired the documentary Beware the Slenderman, which was released in 2016.

History

Origin

The Slender Man was created on June 10, 2009, on a thread in the Something Awful Internet forum. The thread was a Photoshop contest in which users were challenged to "create paranormal images." Forum poster Eric Knudsen, under the pseudonym "Victor Surge", contributed two black-and-white images of groups of children to which he added a tall, thin, spectral figure wearing a black suit. Although previous entries had consisted solely of photographs, Surge supplemented his submission with snatches of text—supposedly from witnesses—describing the abductions of the groups of children and giving the character the name "The Slender Man":

The quote under the first photograph read:

The quote under the second photograph read:

These additions effectively transformed the photographs into a work of fiction. Subsequent posters expanded upon the character, adding their own visual or textual contributions.

Knudsen was inspired to create the Slender Man primarily by Zack Parsons' "That Insidious Beast", Stephen King's The Mist, reports of shadow people, Mothman and the Mad Gasser of Mattoon. Other inspirations for the character were the Tall Man from the 1979 film Phantasm, H. P. Lovecraft, the surrealist work of William S. Burroughs, and the survival horror video games Silent Hill and Resident Evil. Knudsen's intention was "to formulate something whose motivations can barely be comprehended, and [which caused] unease and terror in a general population." Other pre-existing fictional or legendary creatures which are similar to the Slender Man include: the Gentlemen, black-suited, pale, bald demons from the Buffy the Vampire Slayer episode "Hush"; men in black, many accounts of which grant them an uncanny appearance with an unnatural walk and "oriental" features; and The Question, a DC Comics superhero with a blank face, whose secret identity is "Victor Sage", a name similar to Knudsen's alias "Victor Surge".

In her book, Folklore, Horror Stories, and the Slender Man: The Development of an Internet Mythology, Professor Shira Chess of the University of Georgia connected the Slender Man to ancient folklore about fairies. Like fairies, the Slender Man is otherworldly, with motives that are often difficult to grasp; like fairies, his appearance is vague and often shifts to reflect what the viewer wants or fears to see, and, like fairies, the Slender Man lives in the woods and wild places and kidnaps children.

Early development

The Slender Man soon went viral, spawning numerous works of fanart, cosplay, and online fiction known as "creepypasta"—horror stories told in short snatches of easily copyable text that spread from site to site. Divorced from its original creator, the Slender Man became the subject of myriad stories by multiple authors within an overarching mythos.

Many aspects of the Slender Man mythos first appeared on the original Something Awful thread. One of the earliest additions was added by a forum user named "Thoreau-Up", who created a folklore story set in 16th-century Germany involving a character called Der Großman, which was implied to be an early reference to the Slender Man. The first video series involving the Slender Man evolved from a post on the Something Awful thread by user "ce gars". It tells of a fictional film school friend named Alex Kralie, who had stumbled upon something troubling while shooting his first feature-length project, Marble Hornets. The video series, published in found footage style on YouTube, forms an alternate reality game describing the filmers' fictional experiences with the Slender Man. The ARG also incorporates a Twitter feed and an alternate YouTube channel created by a user named "totheark". As of 2013, Marble Hornets had over 250,000 subscribers around the world and had received 55 million views. Other Slender Man-themed YouTube serials followed, including EverymanHYBRID and TribeTwelve.

In 2012, the Slender Man was adapted into a video game titled Slender: The Eight Pages; within its first month of release, the game was downloaded over 2 million times. Several popular variants of the game followed, including Slenderman's Shadow and Slender Man for iOS, which became the second most-popular app download. The sequel to Slender: The Eight Pages, Slender: The Arrival, was released in 2013. Several independent films about the Slender Man have been released or are in development, including Entity and The Slender Man, released free online after a $10,000 Kickstarter campaign. In 2013, it was announced that Marble Hornets would become a feature film.

Description

Because the Slender Man's fictional "mythology" has evolved without an official "canon" for reference, his appearance, motives, habits, and abilities are not fixed but change depending on the storyteller. He is most commonly described as very tall and thin with unnaturally long, tentacle-like arms (or mere tentacles), which he can extend to intimidate or capture prey. In most stories, his face is white and featureless, but occasionally his face appears differently to anyone who sees it. He appears to be wearing a dark suit and tie. The Slender Man is often associated with the forest and/or abandoned locations and has the ability to teleport. Proximity to the Slender Man is often said to trigger a "Slender sickness"; a rapid onset of paranoia, nightmares and delusions accompanied by nosebleeds.

Early stories featured him targeting children or young adults. Some featured young adults driven insane or to act on his behalf, while others did not, and others claim that investigating the Slender Man will draw his attention. The web series Marble Hornets established the idea of proxies (humans who fall under the Slender Man's influence) though initially, they were simply violently insane, rather than puppets of the Slender Man. Marble Hornets also introduced the idea that the Slender Man could interfere with video and audio recordings, as well as the "Slender Man symbol", ⦻, which became a common trope of Slender fiction. Graphic violence and body horror are uncommon in the Slender Man mythos, with many narratives choosing to leave the fate of his victims obscure. Shira Chess notes that "It is important to note that few of the retellings identify exactly what kind of monster the Slender Man might be, and what his specific intentions are- these points all remain mysteriously and usefully vague."

Reasons for popularity

Media scholar and folklorist Andrew Peck attributes the success of the Slender Man to its highly collaborative nature. Because the character and its motives are shrouded in mystery, users can easily adapt existing Slender Man tropes and imagery to create new stories. This ability for users to tap into the ideas of others while also supplying their own helped inspire the collaborative culture that arose surrounding the Slender Man. Instead of privileging the choices of certain creators as canonical, this collaborative culture informally locates ownership of the creature across the community. In these respects, the Slender Man is similar to campfire stories or urban legends, and the character's success comes from enabling both social interaction and personal acts of creative expression.

Although nearly all users understand that the Slender Man is not real, they suspend that disbelief in order to become more engrossed when telling or listening to stories. This adds a sense of authenticity to Slender Man legend performances and blurs the lines between legend and reality, keeping the creature as an object of legend dialectic. This ambiguity has led some to some confusion over the character's origin and purpose. Only five months after his creation, George Noory's Coast to Coast AM, a radio call-in show devoted to the paranormal and conspiracy theories, began receiving callers asking about the Slender Man. Two years later, an article in the Minneapolis Star Tribune described his origins as "difficult to pinpoint." Eric Knudsen has commented that many people, despite understanding that the Slender Man was created on the Something Awful forums, still entertain the possibility that he might be real.

Shira Chess describes the Slender Man as a metaphor for "helplessness, power differentials, and anonymous forces." Peck sees parallels between the Slender Man and common anxieties about the digital age, such as feelings of constant connectedness and unknown third-party observation. Similarly, Tye Van Horn, a writer for The Elm, has suggested that the Slender Man represents modern fear of the unknown; in an age flooded with information, people have become so unaccustomed to ignorance that they now fear what they cannot understand. Troy Wagner, the creator of Marble Hornets, ascribes the terror of the Slender Man to its malleability; people can shape it into whatever frightens them most. Tina Marie Boyer noted that "The Slender man is a prohibitive monster, but the cultural boundaries he guards are not clear. Victims do not know when they have violated or crossed them."

Waukesha stabbing

On May 31, 2014, two 12-year-old girls in Waukesha, Wisconsin held down and stabbed a 12-year-old classmate 19 times. When questioned later by authorities, they reportedly claimed that they wished to commit a murder as a first step to becoming proxies for the Slender Man, having read about it online. They also stated that they were afraid that Slender Man would kill their families if they did not commit the murder. After the perpetrators left the scene, the victim crawled out of the woods to a roadway. A passing cyclist alerted authorities, and the victim survived the attack. Both attackers have been diagnosed with mental illnesses but have also been charged as adults and are each facing up to 65 years in prison. One of the girls reportedly said Slender Man watches her, can read minds and could teleport.

Experts testified in court that she also said she conversed with Lord Voldemort and one of the Teenage Mutant Ninja Turtles. On August 1, 2014, she was found incompetent to stand trial and her prosecution was suspended until her condition improved. On November 12, 2014, a doctor judged that her condition had improved enough for her to stand trial, and on December 19, 2014, the judge ruled that both girls were competent to stand trial. In August 2015, the presiding judge ruled that the girls would be tried as adults. They were tried separately. On August 21, 2017, one of the girls, now 15, pleaded guilty to being a party to attempted second-degree homicide, but claimed she was not responsible for her actions on grounds of insanity. Although prosecutors alleged that she knew what she was doing was wrong, the jury determined that she was mentally ill during the attack. She will spend at least three years in a mental hospital. On December 21, Waukesha County Circuit Judge Michael Bohren sentenced Weier, then 16 years old, to be hospitalized for 25 years from the date of the crime, which would keep her institutionalized until age 37.

In a statement to the media on June 4, 2014, Eric Knudsen said, "I am deeply saddened by the tragedy in Wisconsin and my heart goes out to the families of those affected by this terrible act." He stated he would not be giving interviews on the matter.

On September 25, 2017, it was reported that Morgan Geyser, then 15, had agreed to plead guilty to attempting to commit first-degree homicide in an arrangement that would allow her to avoid jail time. On February 1, 2018, the Associated Press reported that Geyser had been sentenced to 40 years in the Wisconsin mental hospital, the maximum sentence allowed.

Moral panic and other incidents
The stabbing in Waukesha spawned a nationwide moral panic over Slender Man across the United States. Parents across the nation became worried about the potential dangers that stories about Slender Man might pose to their children's safety. Russell Jack, the police chief of Waukesha, warned that the Slender Man stabbing "should be a wake-up call for all parents" that "the internet is full of dark and wicked things"—a warning which numerous media outlets publicized.

After hearing the story, an unidentified woman from Cincinnati, Ohio, told a WLWT TV reporter in June 2014 that her 13-year-old daughter had attacked her with a knife, and had written macabre fiction, some involving the Slender Man, who the mother said motivated the attack.

On September 4, 2014, a 14-year-old girl in Port Richey, Florida, allegedly set her family's house on fire while her mother and nine-year-old brother were inside. Police reported that the teenager had been reading online stories about Slender Man as well as Atsushi Ōkubo's manga Soul Eater. Eddie Daniels of the Pasco County Sheriff's Office said the girl "had visited the website that contains a lot of the Slender Man information and stories [...] It would be safe to say there is a connection to that."

During an early 2015 epidemic of suicide attempts by young people ages 12 to 24 on the Pine Ridge Indian Reservation, Slender Man was cited as an influence; the Oglala Sioux tribe president noted that many Native Americans traditionally believe in a "suicide spirit" similar to the Slender Man. Other Sioux describe the "Big Man" as a messenger or sign, warning that society is developing in a dangerous direction.

A documentary film on the incident called Beware the Slenderman, directed by Irene Taylor Brodsky, was released by HBO Films in March 2016, and was broadcast on HBO on January 23, 2017.

After the Waukesha stabbing
The Waukesha stabbing and the negative media attention it generated irreversibly altered the Slender Man legend and the online community surrounding it. What had previously just been a creepy horror meme to most people suddenly acquired a new level of reality that most fans of Slender Man found horrifying. Meanwhile, by around the same time, the Slender Man character had lost much of his original popularity. Most of the original blogs that had once been devoted to Slender Man either shut down completely or became less popular. Slender Man's presence in mainstream popular culture also contributed to a decline in how frightening he seemed to many people.

The late 2010s also saw an increase in benevolent portrayals of Slender Man, with many depictions of him from this period portraying him as an antihero who protects victimized children from bullies, although often by violent means. In some portrayals of Slender Man from the late 2010s, he has a daughter named Skinny Sally, who is portrayed as a young girl covered in cuts and bruises. Slender Man sometimes is portrayed carrying Skinny Sally on his shoulders protectively. Lynn McNeill, assistant professor of folklore at Utah State University, observes that the increase in benevolent portrayals of Slender Man seems to have begun shortly after the stabbing in Waukesha and states that this trend towards a benevolent Slender Man may be a reaction by fans of the character to the violence of the stabbing.

Despite the decline in popular interest in Slender Man, commercial adaptations of the character continued. In 2015, the film adaptation of Marble Hornets, titled Always Watching: A Marble Hornets Story, was released on VOD, where the character was portrayed by Doug Jones. In 2016, Sony Pictures subsidiary Screen Gems partnered with Mythology Entertainment to bring a Slender Man film into theatres, with the title character portrayed by Javier Botet.

The film generated considerable controversy soon after it was announced, with many accusing the filmmakers of trying to capitalize off the Waukesha stabbing. Bill Weier, the father of Anissa Weier, stated, "It's absurd they want to make a movie like this... All we're doing is extending the pain all three of these families have gone through." The progressive advocacy group Care2 created an online petition, which received over 19,000 signatures, demanding that the film not be released, labelling the film "crass commercialism at its worst" and "a naked cash grab built on the exploitation of a deeply traumatic event and the people who lived it." Sony representatives insisted that the film was based on the fictional character that had become popular online and not on the Waukesha stabbing.

Upon its release in August 2018, the film Slender Man, despite being declared a box-office bomb and receiving both little marketing and overwhelmingly negative reviews from critics, went on to gross several times its $10 million budget worldwide. David Ehrlich of IndieWire gave the film a D, writing "a tasteless and inedibly undercooked serving of the Internet's stalest creepypasta, Slender Man aspires to be for the YouTube era what The Ring was to the last gasps of the VHS generation. But... there's one fundamental difference that sets the two movies apart: The Ring is good, and Slender Man is terrible." Writing for The Verge, Carli Velocci called the Slender Man movie "a nail in the coffin of a dying fandom".

Folkloric qualities

Several scholars have argued that, despite being a fictional work with an identifiable origin point, the Slender Man represents a form of digital folklore. Shira Chess argues that the Slender Man exemplifies the similarities between traditional folklore and the open source ethos of the Internet, and that, unlike those of traditional monsters such as vampires and werewolves, the fact that the Slender Man's mythos can be tracked and signposted offers a powerful insight into how myth and folklore form. Chess identifies three aspects of the Slender Man mythos that tie it to folklore: collectivity (meaning that it is created by a collective, rather than a single individual), variability (meaning that the story changes depending on the teller), and performance (meaning that the storyteller's narrative changes to reflect the audience's response).

Andrew Peck also considers the Slender Man to be an authentic form of folklore and notes its similarity to emergent forms of offline legend performance. Peck suggests that digital folklore performance extends the dynamics of face-to-face performance in several notable ways, such as by occurring asynchronously, encouraging imitation and personalization while also allowing perfect replication, combining elements of oral, written, and visual communication, and generating shared expectations for performance that enact group identity despite the lack of a physically present group. He concludes that the Slender Man represents a digital legend cycle that combines the generic conventions and emergent qualities of oral and visual performance with the collaborative potential of networked communication.

Jeff Tolbert also accepts the Slender Man as folkloric and suggests it represents a process he calls "reverse ostension." Ostension in folkloristics is the process of acting out a folk narrative. According to Tolbert, the Slender Man does the opposite by creating a set of folklore-like narratives where none existed before. It is an iconic figure produced through a collective effort and deliberately modeled after an existing and familiar folklore genre. According to Tolbert, this represents two processes in one: it involves the creation of new objects and new disconnected examples of experience, and it involves the combination of these elements into a body of "traditional" narratives, modeled on existing folklore (but not wholly indebted to any specific tradition).

Professor Thomas Pettitt of the University of Southern Denmark has described the Slender Man as being an exemplar of the modern age's closing of the "Gutenberg Parenthesis"; the time period from the invention of the printing press to the spread of the web in which stories and information were codified in discrete media, to a return to the older, more primal forms of storytelling, exemplified by oral tradition and campfire tales, in which the same story can be retold, reinterpreted and recast by different tellers, allowing the lore to expand and evolve with time.

Copyright
Despite his folkloric qualities, the Slender Man is not in the public domain. Several for-profit ventures involving the Slender Man have unequivocally acknowledged Knudsen as the creator of this fictional character, while others were civilly blocked from distribution (including the Kickstarter-funded film) after legal complaints from Knudsen and other sources. Though Knudsen himself has given his personal blessing to a number of Slender Man-related projects, the issue is complicated by the fact that, while he is the character's creator, a third party holds the options to any adaptations into other media, including film and television. The identity of this option holder has not been made public. Knudsen himself has argued that his enforcement of copyright has less to do with money than with artistic integrity: "I just want something amazing to come off it... something that's scary and disturbing and kinda different. I would hate for something to come out and just be kinda conventional." In May 2016, the media rights to Slender Man were sold to production company Mythology Entertainment, but the company split up in 2019, leaving the ownership of the character's rights in question.

References in media
In 2011, Markus "Notch" Persson, creator of the sandbox indie game Minecraft, added a new hostile mob to the game, which he named the "Enderman" when multiple users on Reddit and Google+ commented on the similarity to the Slender Man. 
The Slender Man was the antagonist of the season 3 Lost Girl episode "SubterrFaenean", in which the Slender Man was said to be the basis for the Pied Piper legend.
In early 2013 a song and animated video called "Sympathy For Slender Man" from the Fox late night animated block Animation Domination High-Def aired in between programs, known as ADHD Shorts.
In the 2014 episode "Pinkie Apple Pie" of My Little Pony: Friendship is Magic, a pony version of the character appears in a brief cameo.
The TV series Supernatural parodied Slender Man as "Thinman" in the Season 9 episode of the same name. 
In 2016, American horror punk band Haunted Garage released an EP entitled Slenderman and Other Strange Tales, featuring a song and accompanying music video based on both the character and the 2014 stabbing case. 
The sixteenth season of the crime drama TV series Law & Order: Special Victims Unit featured an episode, "Glasgowman's Wrath", inspired by the Slender Man stabbings.
The board game Kingdom Death: Monster features an expansion pack based on Slender Man.
AdventureQuest Worlds has featured numerous armors and pets that are based on Slender Man.
Slender Man appears in the episode "The Planned Parenthood Show" in Big Mouth.
The Slender Man was mentioned by Ben Chang in the episode "Ladders" of Community.
Slender Man and his clones appear in the campaign level "Slender Forest" in video game Pixel Gun 3D.

See also

Kunekune – Another message board urban legend with wriggly appendages
Pope Lick Monster – Another urban legend of a compulsive being with real consequences
The Silbón – A Colombian/Venezuelan legendary figure, who shares some traits with Slender Man

Notes

References

Further reading

External links

Forum thread in which Slender Man was created, somethingawful.com
Eric Knudsen's gallery that contains all of his Slender Man images, deviantart.com
Pixel Gun 3D "Slender Forest" level, youtube.com

 
2000s fads and trends
2010s fads and trends
American legends
Creepypasta
Fictional characters introduced in 2009
Fictional characters who can teleport
Fictional cult leaders
Fictional demons and devils
Fictional humanoids
Fictional kidnappers
Fictional mass murderers
Fictional monsters
Fictional murderers of children
Fictional serial killers
Fictional stalkers
Fictional torturers
Internet memes introduced in 2009
Lovecraftian horror
Male horror film villains
Male video game villains
Mass media-related controversies in the United States
Urban legends